David Pearl is a British property developer from North London. He previously appeared on the Channel 4 show The Secret Millionaire.

Early life
Pearl was born in Luton, Bedfordshire in October 1945. His family moved to Stamford Hill in London, where his father Harry worked in a millinery factory. His family struggled financially throughout Pearl's life, something he has referred to through vignettes. He left school at age 15 to work as a packer for a clothing company and as a part-time casino croupier.

Ventures

Pearl & Coutts 
In 1965, at age 19, Pearl set up property management and letting agency Pearl & Coutts. Within three years, he began buying properties to let from the auction. The first of his properties was an interest-free mortgage of £7 a week, which he let for £10. His mother later used her own house as collateral to secure Pearl a bank loan for his third property. Pearl continued to personally acquire and let properties for ten years from their offices in London's East End area of Hackney. Initial properties were residential, typically in the Hackney and Islington areas. Pearl & Coutts later diversified with commercial property in Central London and the West End.

Structadene Ltd 
Pearl created Structadene Limited, a limited company encompassing Pearl & Coutts, in 1978. Structadene traded throughout the recession; their acquisition strategy included purchasing properties in parts of London not typically considered of interest to property investment. In 1980, the company acquired the Jesus Hospital Estate, a 350-house development in Bethnal Green, which they purchased for £1.2m. As property values began to increase over time, the area, which encompassed Fitzrovia, became known as NoHo. Structadene also owned buildings along Great Portland Street and Great Titchfield Street.

In 2006, the Sunday Times ranked Structadene #65 in its "Profit Track" list of top 100 companies and estimates its profit increase between 2001 and 2004 to be 63%. The increase was attributed to diversified risk across commercial sectors and digitizing management operations. By late 2007, Structadene's annual report listed 68% portfolio value located in London and an additional 12% in South East England. Nearly half of the properties were office spaces, with rental units being the next largest investment.

Structadene's annual report in September 2008 showed financing with 20 banks/building societies. The group and share of joint venture turnover was reported at £102,519,735 with net assets at £152,020,063 and reserves of £102,329,048. Since then, Structadene has focused on joint ventures and in 2010 oversaw 200 joint venture-style entities. Between October 2009 and February 2010, Structadene had sold as much as £50m worth of its portfolio, unusual for the company as they tended to retain rather than resell.

Public image
Pearl was described in a 2003 interview with The Lawyer as an "old school" businessman favouring a "gentleman’s agreement" over routine legal outsourcing. His personal approach to business has been represented as keeping as much as possible in-house and a hands-on approach to acquiring property. Auctioneer Duncan Moir has stated Pearl operates by buying property he genuinely likes, "as though he were a collector, rather than an investor". Pearl's fashion choices have been described as "perennially dressed down" and "famously scruffy." In 2006, he claimed to spend around £91 a year on clothing.

Pearl appeared in a 2007 episode of Secret Millionaire wherein he successfully posed as a new volunteer at Queen Alexandra Hospital in Portsmouth. At the end of the episode, he had donated £50,000 to various recipients, including a fellow volunteer and to stroke rehabilitation and cancer care organisations.

Controversies
In 2000, Structadene sued Hackney Council under the Local Government Act 1972. A high court judge found the Council had acted illegally in the sale of 12 commercial industrial units to existing tenants at £40,000. The Council's sale was after they had already refused a £100,000 offer from Structadene, going against their duty to sell to the highest bidder.

In 2007, Structadene placed a bid for a portfolio of 277 properties, including commercial units, with Islington London Borough Council. Local press valued the purchase at £45m despite Structadene's offer of £70m. Tenants were reportedly concerned about rent increases, and at least two property traders had been edged out of the bid due to the quick turnaround time. Structadene responded that they would discuss rent prices with each tenant in an effort "to keep the unique nature of the borough."

Personal life
Pearl is the vice president of Tottenham Hotspur. According to the Sunday Times Rich List in 2019, Pearl was worth £456 million, an increase of £57 million from 2018.

References

External links
 Pearl Coutts
 Structadene

1945 births
Living people
English businesspeople
People from Luton
British real estate businesspeople